Fountainbridge/Craiglockhart is one of the 17 wards of the City of Edinburgh Council. It elects three councillors. Established in 2007 along with the other wards, it covers a compact suburban area south-west of the centre of Edinburgh including the Chesser, Craiglockhart, Greenbank Village, Hutchison, Kingsknowe (added in a minor boundary change in 2017) and Slateford neighbourhoods, and a thin, densely populated corridor leading towards the centre taking in Fountainbridge and North Merchiston / Shandon. In 2019, the ward had a population of 23,715.

Councillors

Election results

2022 election
2022 City of Edinburgh Council election

2017 election

2012 election

2007 election

References

External links
Listed Buildings in Fountainbridge/Craiglockhart Ward, City of Edinburgh at British Listed Buildings

Wards of Edinburgh